Phillip Simmonds and Tim Smyczek were the defending champions but did not defend their title.

Rajeev Ram and Bobby Reynolds defeated Harsh Mankad and Scott Oudsema in the final (6–3, 6–7(6), [10–3]).

Seeds

Draw

Draw

References
 Main Draw

Price LeBlanc Lexus Pro Tennis Classic - Doubles
Baton Rouge Pro Tennis Classic